Rolf Slotboom (August 23, 1973 in Amsterdam, Netherlands) is a Dutch poker player and writer. Apart from playing and writing, Slotboom also acts as commentator during poker broadcasts for Eurosport. In October 2005, Rolf became the first Dutch Poker Champion. 

As of 2015, his total live tournament poker earnings exceed $650,000.

Published works 
 Secrets of Short Handed Pot-Limit Omaha (co-authored with Rob Hollink)  
 Secrets of Professional Pot-Limit Omaha  
 Secrets of Professional Poker 1
 Hold'em on the Come: Limit Hold'em Strategy for Drawing Hands (co-authored with Dew Mason)
 Pokerface (in Dutch)

Notes

External links
Official site
Cardplayer Magazine archive of Slotboom's articles

1973 births
Living people
Dutch poker players
Gambling writers
Sportspeople from Amsterdam